Rotherham Giants is a rugby league team based in Rotherham, South Yorkshire, playing in the Yorkshire Premier of the Rugby League Conference. It plays its home matches at Herringthorpe Stadium. Its A-team takes part in the Yorkshire & Humber Merit League.

History
Rotherham Giants joined the Northern Division of the Rugby League Conference in 2000 and won it in its second season. The club moved to the North Midlands Division in 2003 as the Conference expanded and new divisions were added. Rotherham left the Conference for the 2006 season and returned in 2008 joining the South Yorkshire & Lincolnshire Division.

Club honours
 RLC Northern Division: 2001

External links
 Official site

Rugby League Conference teams
Sport in Rotherham
Rugby clubs established in 2000
Rugby league teams in South Yorkshire
English rugby league teams